A stress ball or hand exercise ball is a malleable toy, usually not more than 7 cm in diameter, which is squeezed in the hand and manipulated by the fingers, ostensibly to relieve stress and muscle tension or to exercise the muscles of the hand. Patrick Hummel is widely understood to have created the stress ball in central Indiana in the mid-1980s.

Despite the name, many stress balls are not spherical. Some are molded in amusing shapes, and pad- or transfer-printed with corporate logos. They may be presented to employees and clients of companies as promotional gifts. Because of the many non-spherical shapes now available, stress balls are generically known as stress relievers.

Types

There are several different types of stress balls that originate from many different countries. The most common type of stress ball in America is the "bean bag" type, commonly known as a "Hacky Sack". In Australia, most common are the foam type, which prevents stress through resistance from squeezing the ball. Chinese-form balls are known as the Baoding ball; unlike others, these are not squeezable as they are solid and come in pairs, allowing users to roll them together to make a soothing sound and a smooth sensation feeling in one's hands. They come in many cute shapes and sizes too. 

Some stress relievers are made from closed-cell polyurethane foam rubber. These are made by injecting the liquid components of the foam into a mold. The resulting chemical reaction creates carbon dioxide bubbles as a byproduct, which in turn creates the foam.

Stress balls, especially those used in physical therapy, can also contain gel of different densities inside a rubber or cloth skin. Another type uses a thin rubber membrane surrounding a fine powder. The latter type can be made at home by filling a balloon with baking soda. Some balls similar to a footbag are marketed and used as stress balls.

See also 
 Fidget spinner
 Fidget Cube
 Worry beads
 Worry stone
 Squishies
Pop it (toy)

References 

Ergonomics
Physical therapy
Stress (biological and psychological)
Balls
Executive toys
Rubber toys
Sensory toys